Hong Kong competed at the 2019 World Aquatics Championships in Gwangju, South Korea from 12 to 28 July.

Artistic swimming

Hong Kong's artistic swimming team consisted of 10 female athletes.

Women

 Legend: (R) = Reserve Athlete

Diving

Hong Kong entered one diver.

Women

Open water swimming

Hong Kong qualified two male and two female open water swimmers.

Men

Women

Mixed

Swimming

Men

Women

Mixed

References

World Aquatics Championships
2019
Nations at the 2019 World Aquatics Championships